The 1954 Florida A&M Rattlers football team was an American football team that represented Florida A&M University as a member of the Southern Intercollegiate Athletic Conference (SIAC) during the 1954 college football season. The team played its home games at Bragg Stadium in Tallahassee, Florida.

The Pittsburgh Courier selected Florida A&M as Black college national co-champion in a five-way tie with four other teams. The "Pigskin Huddle" rated Florida A&M No. 2 with Tennessee A&I as the national champion.

Key players included Willie Galimore.

Schedule

References

Florida AandM
Florida A&M Rattlers football seasons
Black college football national champions
Florida AandM Rattlers football